"Ready for Love" is a song by German group Cascada from their debut album Everytime We Touch. It was featured on the 2006 Ready For Love E.P. alongside "One More Night" and "Love Again".

On 7 November 2012, Cascada's official YouTube page uploaded an unplugged version of the song, in a similar style to Cascada's previous 'Candlelight' Remixes.

Track listing
German EP
 Ready For Love [Club Mix] (4:54)
 One More Night [Club Mix] (5:32)
 Love Again [Club Mix] (5:29)

Swedish Download Single

Ready For Love (Radio Edit) (3:25)
Ready For Love (Klubbingman Remix Edit) (3:47)
Ready For Love (ItaloBrothers New Vox Remix Edit) (3:31)
Ready For Love (Club Mix) (4:54)
Ready For Love (Klubbingman Remix) (6:23)

Digital Download EP
 Ready For Love [Club Mix] (4:54)
 One More Night [Club Mix] (5:32)
 Love Again [Club Mix] (5:29)
 Ready For Love [Radio Edit] (3:23)
 One More Night [Radio Edit] (3:42)
 Love Again [Radio Edit] (3:27)

All remixes
Ready For Love (Club Mix) (4:57)
Ready For Love (Italobrothers New Vox Remix) (5:23)
Ready For Love (Italobrothers New Vox Remix Edit) (3:31)
Ready For Love (Radio Edit) (3:25)
Ready For Love (Klubbingman Remix) (6:35)
Ready For Love (Klubbingman Remix Edit) (3:49)

References

2006 singles
Cascada songs
2006 songs
Songs written by DJ Manian
Songs written by Yanou